The following is an episode list for the Australian television show Mako: Island of Secrets (known internationally as Mako Mermaids), which first aired on Network Ten in Australia, later moving to channel Eleven. Series one premiered in Australia on 26 July 2013. The first half of the series was released simultaneously on Netflix, with the second half released on 15 September 2013. Series two premiered its first half on Netflix on 13 February 2015 and the second half on 29 May 2015. Series 3 began airing on Eleven 15 May 2016 and was released internationally on Netflix on 27 May 2016.

Series overview

Episodes

Series 1 (2013–14)

Series 2 (2015) 
Two other members of the Mako mermaid pod set out to take away Zac's merman powers so that the pod may return home, but they don't realise his connection to Mako Island may not be accidental. The ruins of an ancient merman temple are discovered by Zac; while only he sees the ruins at first, they can be seen by all during a full moon. Another merman arrives intent on taking Mako Island's power for himself.

Series two introduces three new characters: mermaids Ondina and Mimmi, played by Isabel Durant and Allie Bertram, and merman Erik, played by Alex Cubis. Series two was announced in February 2013, with production scheduled for the second half of 2013. Series two features 26 half-hour episodes. The first half of the series premiered on 13 February 2015 on Netflix in North America, the United Kingdom, and other territories. The second half of the series premiered on 29 May 2015.

Series 3 (2016) 
When a Chinese mermaid named Weilan accidentally releases a water dragon from an ancient relic, she flees to Mako Island with the creature in pursuit. Mermaids Ondina and Mimmi must defend Mako Island and the Gold Coast from destruction. Series three debuted in Australia on 15 May 2016 on Eleven and was released on Netflix on 27 May 2016. It features 16 half-hour episodes.

Cariba Heine guest stars in the final two episodes, reprising her role from H2O: Just Add Water as Rikki Chadwick.

References

External links 
 Episode guide at the Internet Movie Database

Mako: Island of Secrets List
Lists of Australian children's television series episodes
Lists of Australian drama television series episodes
Lists of fantasy television series episodes